The Clements Stone Arch Bridge is a historic bridge across the Cottonwood River  southeast of Clements, Kansas. The bridge was built in 1886 by L. P. Santy and Company of Clements, who contracted with the Chase County commission to build it for $12,000. The stone used for the bridge was quarried in Clements, as Santy and Co. also operated a quarry; the use of local materials allows the bridge to match its natural surroundings. The bridge's nomination to the National Register of Historic Places described it as "a masterpiece of design and stone construction" and "one of the most handsome bridges in the state".

The bridge was added to the National Register of Historic Places on December 12, 1976.

References

External links

		
National Register of Historic Places in Chase County, Kansas
Bridges on the National Register of Historic Places in Kansas
Bridges completed in 1886
Arch bridges in the United States